Mark Ronald Cullinan (born 3 April 1957) is a South African former cricketer.

Cullinan was born at Johannesburg in April 1957 and educated at Hilton College. He studied at university in South Africa, making his debut in first-class cricket for a combined South African Universities cricket team against Transvaal at Johannesburg in 1979.

Career 
He later before undertook his post-graduate studies in England at Worcester College, Oxford. He played first-class cricket while studying in England for Oxford University, debuting for the university against Lancashire at Oxford in 1983. 

He played first-class cricket for Oxford until 1984, making a total of fifteen appearances. He scored a total of 210 runs in his fifteen matches for Oxford, with an average of 11.66 and a high score of 59.  

In addition to playing first-class cricket while at Oxford, he also made two List A one-day appearances for the Combined Universities cricket team in the 1983 Benson & Hedges Cup. He later became a diamond dealer and currently resides in Monaco.

References

External links

1957 births
Living people
People from Johannesburg
South African cricketers
South African Universities cricketers
Alumni of Worcester College, Oxford
Oxford University cricketers
British Universities cricketers
Alumni of Hilton College (South Africa)